Christian Pläge (born 1 November 1956) is a Swiss equestrian. He competed in two events at the 2004 Summer Olympics. Christian is married to Swiss Grand Prix rider Birgit Wientzek Pläge.

References

External links
 

1956 births
Living people
Swiss male equestrians
Swiss dressage riders
Olympic equestrians of Switzerland
Equestrians at the 2004 Summer Olympics
Sportspeople from Düsseldorf (region)
People from Rhein-Kreis Neuss
21st-century Swiss people